The 1979 Volvo Tennis Cup was a women's singles tennis tournament played on outdoor hard courts at the Ramapo College in Mahwah, New Jersey in the United States. The event was part of the AA category of the 1979 Colgate Series. It was the second edition of the tournament and was held from 20 September through 26 September 1979. First-seeded Chris Evert won the singles title and earned $14,000 first-prize money.

Finals

Singles
 Chris Evert defeated  Tracy Austin 6–7(2–7), 6–4, 6–1
It was Evert's 8th singles title of the year and the 93rd of her career.

Doubles
 Tracy Austin /  Betty Stöve defeated  Mima Jaušovec /  Regina Maršíková 7–6(7–4), 2–6, 6–4

Prize money

Notes

References

External links
 International Tennis Federation (ITF) tournament details
  Women's Tennis Association (WTA) tournament details

Volvo Tennis Cup
WTA New Jersey
1979 in sports in New Jersey
Mahwah, New Jersey
1979 in American tennis